Christopher Bishop (born 4 September 1983) is a New Zealand National Party politician who was first elected to the New Zealand House of Representatives in 2014 as a list MP. Bishop won the Hutt South electorate in 2017 but lost the seat in 2020. He returned to Parliament as a National list MP and served as National spokesperson for Housing and Infrastructure and is the Shadow Leader of the House. He is the Chairperson of National's 2023 Election Campaign.

Early life 
Bishop grew up in Lower Hutt and attended Eastern Hutt School primary, Hutt Intermediate School and Hutt International Boys' School in Upper Hutt. His father is political journalist, and founder of the New Zealand Taxpayers' Union, John Bishop, and his mother, Rosemary Dixon, is an environmental lawyer. In 2000 he was a member of the New Zealand Youth Parliament, selected to represent List MP Muriel Newman. He graduated Victoria University of Wellington with first-class honours in Law and a Bachelor of Arts in History and Politics. He won 10 intervarsity debating tournaments, including at the Cambridge Union and Sydney Union, and a range of awards for legal argument and oratory. He met his partner, Jenna Raeburn, through the Victoria University Debating Society. Bishop worked as a summer clerk at Russell McVeagh and Crown Law while at university. While at university he had a part-time position at the Ministry of Education to draft letters for the then Minister of Education, Trevor Mallard.

Bishop spent a year working as a researcher for the National Party. Then, after the 2008 general election, he worked as a ministerial advisor for Gerry Brownlee for several years. Then he worked as a lobbyist for the tobacco company Philip Morris and as a staffer to Steven Joyce.  Bishop is a former tobacco lobbyist for Phillip Morris.

Political career

Bishop's work for Philip Morris attracted headlines and comments when he stood for parliament for the National Party, given he worked against the party's plans to increase tobacco excise and introduce plain packaging. On the day of his selection as a candidate he announced that he supported both policies.

First term: 2014–2017 
He contested the Hutt South electorate at the 2014 election, where he placed second behind incumbent Labour MP Trevor Mallard but entered Parliament as a list MP for the 2014–2017 term. Redistribution of electorate boundaries prior to the election saw Hutt South lose the Labour-leaning suburb of Naenae for the National-leaning western hill suburbs, helping Bishop cut Mallard's majority from 4,825 to 709.

Bishop served on the Finance and Expenditure, Justice and Electoral, and Regulations Review select committees.  Bishop  was also part of a cross-party group initiated by Jan Logie to look at and advocate for LGBTI rights. A member's bill in Bishop's name, the Compensation for Live Organ Donors’ Act 2016, passed the house unanimously. The bill aims to remove a financial deterrent to the donation of organs by live donors.

Second term: 2017–2020 
Bishop won the Hutt South electorate at the 2017 New Zealand general election. Long-serving Member of Parliament for Hutt South Trevor Mallard did not contest the election, instead choosing to only appear on the Labour list to become Speaker of the House. Ginny Andersen stood as the Labour candidate. Bishop defeated her by a margin of 1,530 votes. In doing so, Bishop became the first-ever National MP for the seat. This result was credited to a 4-year campaign in the area that donned him the title "Mr Everywhere Man".

The formation of the Sixth Labour Government saw Bishop serve in Opposition. Following Bill English's resignation in February 2018, Bishop publicly endorsed Amy Adams for Leader of the National Party. Adams represented the more liberal wing of the National Party. Adams lost the leadership vote to Simon Bridges. Bridges promoted Bishop into his shadow cabinet in June 2019, allocating him the portfolios of Transport and Regional Development.

In February 2018 it was disclosed that Bishop was using the social media platform Snapchat to communicate with his constituents including teenage girls. Parents of the affected stated that his intentions appeared misguided and not malicious. Bishop has since stated that he was running the Snapchat account to help young people become interested in politics and has changed his account so to only allow for communication with his close friends. ACT party leader David Seymour has stated his backing for Bishop, saying that "an MP's job is to engage with the young, which is what Bishop was doing".

In March 2020 Bishop went into voluntary isolation for the COVID-19 virus after visiting Australia.

Bishop played a significant role in the May 2020 leadership coup that saw Simon Bridges removed as leader and replaced by Todd Muller, acting as Muller's "numbers man" alongside Nicola Willis. He was subsequently promoted to 12th in caucus with the portfolios of Transport and Infrastructure. Muller resigned after 55 days becoming the shortest serving leader of any political party represented in Parliament in New Zealand's history, being replaced by Judith Collins. Bishop was promoted to the front bench as 7th in caucus, retaining his portfolios and gaining "Shadow Leader of the House". With Muller's backers Bishop and Willis rising under Collins, political commentators speculated that "potential dissenters are being kept busy with big new portfolios".

In June 2020, claims were made by Health Minister David Clark that Bishop lobbied for the early release from the quarantine of two sisters who later tested positive for COVID-19. Bishop later stated that he only forwarded their concern through the appropriate channels. He also stated they should have been tested before being released.

Third term: 2020–present 
Bishop again contested the Hutt South electorate in the 2020 New Zealand general election. He lost the seat to Labour MP Ginny Andersen by a final margin of 3,777 votes. Despite this loss, Bishop was re-elected to Parliament on the National Party list.

On 28 August 2021, Bishop was stripped by party leader Collins of his Shadow Leader of the House portfolio during a reshuffle of her shadow cabinet. Collins claimed that Bishop was stepping down from the portfolio to focus on his role as the National Party's COVID-19 spokesperson. According to Stuff, Bishop had disagreed with the Party's stance on conversion therapy and pushed for a conscience vote on the proposed Conversion Practices Prohibition Legislation Bill. On 30 August, Collins denied losing her temper at Bishop and fellow National MP Erica Stanford for publicly suggesting that they disagreed with the Party's stance on the conversion therapy legislation.

After Collins was deposed as National leader in November 2021, and Christopher Luxon was elected in her place, Bishop was promoted to 4th in the National line up, retaining his COVID-19 Response portfolio in Luxon's Shadow Cabinet, and being reappointed Shadow Leader of the House. In March 2022 he was promoted to third rank in the National line-up and took on the Housing and Infrastructure portfolios. In September 2022 he was appointed as the Chairperson of National's 2023 Election Campaign, and gave up the COVID-19 Response portfolio.

On 19 January 2023, Bishop became the National Party's urban development and Resource Management Act (RMA) Reform spokesperson following a reshuffle of Luxon's Shadow Cabinet.

Personal life 
Bishop has a son with his wife, Jenna Raeburn, born in June 2022. He also has a Samoyed dog called Ladyhawke, named for Australian Prime Minister Bob Hawke.

In 2020, amidst the COVID-19 pandemic in New Zealand, and following the lowering of COVID-19 alert levels, Bishop appeared in parliament with a mullet, nicknamed the 'Bishmullet'.  He states he did it to raise money for a local charity Good Bitches Baking, raising $10,000 for the charity through online donations.

References

|-

|-

1983 births
Living people
People from Lower Hutt
Victoria University of Wellington alumni
New Zealand National Party MPs
Members of the New Zealand House of Representatives
New Zealand list MPs
New Zealand MPs for Hutt Valley electorates
21st-century New Zealand politicians
Candidates in the 2017 New Zealand general election
New Zealand Youth MPs